Northlake Boulevard is an east–west road in Palm Beach County, Florida that currently comprises State Road 850 (SR 850) and County Road 809A (CR 809A) from Seminole Pratt Whitney Road in Loxahatchee to US 1 in North Palm Beach.

Route description

CR 809A
As CR 809A, Northlake Boulevard crosses the southernmost portion of Palm Beach Gardens and the northernmost corner of West Palm Beach, beginning at an intersection with Seminole Pratt Whitney Road, in the wetlands north of Loxahatchee.

SR 850

State Road 850 begins at the intersection of State Road 811 and Northlake Boulevard, with Northlake Boulevard serving as the border between Lake Park to the south and North Palm Beach to the north.  SR 850 takes Northlake Boulevard east as a six lane divided road, with shopping destinations lining both sides of the road for the brief 1.2 mile road.  The road crosses a small canal halfway through the road, and it enters North Palm Beach proper 0.2 miles west of the eastern terminus at US 1.

On December 19, 2017, the Palm Beach County Board of Commissioners approved a transfer agreement to submit to the Florida Department of Transportation, which would transfer SR 850 to county maintenance. In May 2018, the transfer was completed, effectively deleting SR 850 from the state highway system. The county has not announced if they intend to maintain the 850 designation, or add it to CR 809A.

History
Before 1970 the road was named West Lake Park Road.

Before 1980, State Road 850 was a Florida Department of Transportation designation for a stretch of Corkscrew Road in Collier County, Florida that is now County Road 850. From 1980 to 1983, State Road 850 was an FDOT designation for the road in Miami-Dade County, Florida that is now SR 932. Northlake Boulevard was given the SR 850 designation in 1983.

Major intersections

References

External links

850
850
809